Ibarbengoa is a station on line 1 of the Bilbao metro. It is located in the neighbourhood of Andra Mari, in the municipality of Getxo. The station was constructed to serve the northernmost part of Getxo and to become the northern terminus of services terminating in Getxo. The station currently serves as the northern terminus for select metro services. The station opened on 15 June 2020.

History 
The construction of a new station in the northern, and mostly rural, neighborhood of Andra Mari in Getxo had been planned for some time, being first announced in 2010 as part of a new urban plan for the area. The plan included the construction of around 8,000 homes, a new metro station and a park and ride facility. The plan was met with strong opposition from the inhabitants of Andra Mari, who claimed the plan benefited residential speculation and the urbanization of an until then mostly rural area.

The construction of the new station finished in 2014, but further protests delayed the construction of the parking facility, as a result the station remained closed. The parking facility was finally finished on late 2019, but its opening was delayed due to problems related the park and ride facility next to the station. The station opened on 15 June 2020.

Station layout 
It is an overground station with two island platforms.

Access 

  Mariturri St.
   Station's interior

Services 
The station is served by line 1 from Etxebarri to Plentzia. The station is also served by regional Bizkaibus bus services.

References

External links
 

Line 1 (Bilbao metro) stations
Railway stations in Spain opened in 2020
2020 establishments in the Basque Country (autonomous community)
Getxo